Emerson Place is a historic townhouse complex located at Watertown in Jefferson County, New York. It was built in 1904 and is a two-story, flat-roofed, brick, nearly symmetrical set of eleven units in the Colonial Revival style. The long facade of the structure is articulated by a series of 3 two-story, projecting, three-sided bay windows; one at each end and a larger one near the center.

It was listed on the National Register of Historic Places in 2003.

References

Houses on the National Register of Historic Places in New York (state)
Colonial Revival architecture in New York (state)
Houses completed in 1904
Houses in Jefferson County, New York
National Register of Historic Places in Watertown, New York